Radbot, Count of Klettgau (c. 9851045) was  (Count) of the county of Klettgau on the High Rhine in Swabia. Radbot was one of the progenitors of the Habsburg dynasty, and he chose to name his fortress Habsburg.

Radbot was probably the second son of Lanzelin of Klettgau (son of Guntram, Count in Breisgau) and the younger brother of Bishop Werner I of Strasbourg. In 1010, he married Ida (before 979–1035), daughter of Duke Frederick I of Upper Lorraine and Beatrice of France. Their son was named Werner I, Count of Habsburg.

Radbot built Habsburg Castle, and in 1027 established Muri Abbey, built up by Benedictine monks descending from Einsiedeln Abbey.

References

External links 
 Genealogical information 

980s births
1045 deaths
Year of birth uncertain
People from Waldshut (district)
House of Habsburg